The Black River is a  river on the Upper Peninsula of the U.S. state of Michigan, flowing mostly in Gogebic County into Lake Superior at . The northern section of the river,  within the boundaries of the Ottawa National Forest, was designated a National Wild and Scenic River in 1992.

At the Lake Superior mouth of the Black River is Black River Harbor, a former fishing station where commercial fishermen brought in cargoes of lake trout.  The North Country Trail crosses the river here via a suspension footbridge.

Waterfalls 
The Wild and Scenic River section of the Black River of Gogebic County is known for the many waterfalls produced as the river tumbles down from near Copper Peak to Lake Superior.

The first three named falls are smaller, farther apart, and have limited access. Some of these waterfalls are easily accessible from the parallel County Road 513 (Black River Road) north of Bessemer, while other waterfalls require a more strenuous hike to see. Roadside trails provide access to Gorge Falls and Potawatomi Falls. The Black River Road was named a National Forest Scenic Byway in 1992. The trails to two of the Black River waterfalls, Gorge and Potawatomi, have been designated National Recreation Trails due to their unique stairway designs (to provide easier access down the steep slopes) and observation platforms.

Narrows, Chippewa, and Algonquin Falls 
The first three waterfalls on the Black River as it approaches Lake Superior are Narrows Falls, Chippewa Falls, and Algonquin Falls. They are the three smallest named waterfalls on the river. Narrows and Algonquin Falls are technically rapids or cascades. These area have limited access and are not often visited.

Great Conglomerate and Potawatomi Falls

Great Conglomerate Falls is the southernmost (the Black River flows north) of the more publicized falls and the first large waterfall on the river's approach to Lake Superior. The river drops  around a large piece of conglomerate rock, boulders and tree trunks into a deep gorge.

Gorge and Sandstone Falls 

Sandstone Falls is named for the sandstone rocks along the riverbed that the river has cut channels through.

Rainbow Falls 
It is also the highest. Here, the water drops  down into a rocky gorge. The waterfall creates much mist, which, on sunny days, creates a constant rainbow. The approach to this waterfall is strenuous: 200 steps are built on staircases and into the side of the hill, creating a very steep approach.

Tributaries and features 
From the mouth:
 Rainbow Falls
 (left) Sagaigan Creek
 Sagaigan Lake
 Sandstone Falls
 Gorge Falls
 Potawatomi Falls
 Great Conglomerate Falls
 (left) Sand Island Creek
 Algonquin Falls
 (left) Kirby Creek
 Chippewa Falls
 (right) Reed Creek
 (left) Narrows Creek
 (left) Montowibo Creek
 (left) Sapsucker Creek
 (right) Sixmile Creek
 (right) Powder Mill Creek
 (left) Sellwood Creek
 (right) Kallander Creek
 Bessemer
 (left) Abitosse Creek
 (left) Jackson Creek
 (right) Planter Creek
 (left) Berranger Creek
 (left) Connor Creek
 (left) Bowden Creek
 (left) Finnegan Creek
 (left) Alward Creek
 (right) McVichie Creek
 Gabbro Falls
 Neepikon Falls
 (left) Little Black River
 Sunday Lake
 Wakefield
 Ramsay
 (left) Sunset Creek
 Granite Falls
 (left) Hosking Creek
 (left) Devils Creek
 (right) Palms Creek
 (left) McDonald Creek
 McDonald Lake
 (left) Bice Creek
 (left) Mosinee Creek
 (right) Wester Creek
 (left) Underwood Creek
 Black River Lake

References 

Wild and Scenic Rivers of the United States
Rivers of Michigan
Rivers of Wisconsin
Waterfalls of Michigan
Rivers of Gogebic County, Michigan
Tributaries of Lake Superior
Rivers of Iron County, Wisconsin
Ottawa National Forest